Eduardo Daniel Arancibia Unger (born 20 July 1976) is a Chilean former footballer.

Career
He played in Mexico and Chilean giant clubs like Universidad de Chile and Universidad Católica.

At international level, he took part in a friendly match of the Chile national team against Alianza Lima on 11 November 1999, what was a 2–0 win, by replacing Claudio Maldonado.

Personal life
He is a member of a football family nicknamed "Arancibia Dynasty" since his three brothers – Franz, Leopoldo and Roque – were professional footballers and his nephew Francisco, son of Leopoldo, is a professional footballer too. In addition, both  his nephew Martín, son of his sister Marcela, and his son Maximiliano, were with the Palestino youth ranks.

Both Eduardo and his relatives, Franz and Francisco, have played for Universidad de Chile. 

His father, Ramón Roque Arancibia, played football at amateur level in Renca, and his mother, Edith Unger, deceased in 2016 and of German descent, was who involved his children in football. His maternal grandfather, Franz Kramer Unger Smuk, also played football.

Honours

Club
Universidad de Chile
 Primera División (2): 1999, 2000
 Copa Chile (2): 1998, 2000

Universidad Católica
 Primera División (1): 2002–A

Cobreloa
 Primera División (1): 2003–C

San Luis de Quillota
 Primera B (1): 2009–C

References

External links
 
 
 Profile at BDFA 

1976 births
Living people
Chilean people of German descent
Footballers from Santiago
Chilean footballers
Chilean expatriate footballers
Chile international footballers
Universidad de Chile footballers
Club Deportivo Universidad Católica footballers
Unión Española footballers
Cobreloa footballers
Rangers de Talca footballers
Universidad de Concepción footballers
C.D. Antofagasta footballers
Santiago Morning footballers
San Luis de Quillota footballers
Atlas F.C. footballers
Club León footballers
Chilean Primera División players
Primera B de Chile players
Liga MX players
Chilean expatriate sportspeople in Mexico
Expatriate footballers in Mexico
Association football midfielders